Carroll Smith-Rosenberg is an American academic and author who is the Mary Frances Berry Collegiate Professor of History, American Culture, and Women's Studies, Emerita, at the University of Michigan, Ann Arbor.

Smith-Rosenberg is known for her scholarship in US women's and gender history, and for her contributions to developing interdisciplinary programs and international scholarly networks addressing women's history, gender studies, the history of sexuality, and cultural and Atlantic studies.

Smith-Rosenberg's article, “The Female World of Love and Ritual,” has been described as creating “a template for how feminists could literally make history” (Potter, 2015). Her article “Discovering the Subject of the Great Constitutional Debate,” was awarded the Binkley-Stephenson Award by the Organization of American Historians in 1993. Smith-Rosenberg's book, This Violent Empire: The Birth of an American National Identity, won a Choice Award for Distinguished Scholarly Book in 2011.

Early life and education
Smith-Rosenberg was born in Yonkers, New York, 15 March 1936 to Carroll Smith and Angela Haug Smith. She grew up near Yankee Stadium, in the Bronx.  Her heritage included a Caribbean grandfather, two centuries of slave-holding ancestors, and “on both sides, Irish grandmothers who didn’t speak to one another” (Smith-Rosenberg, 2007).

Smith-Rosenberg obtained a BA from the Connecticut College for Women (1957) and her MA (1958) and PhD (1968) from Columbia University, where she worked with Richard Hofstadter and Robert Cross (Smith-Rosenberg, 1971). From 1972 – 1975 Smith-Rosenberg held a Post-doctoral Fellowship in Psychiatry at the Medical School of the University of Pennsylvania, where she also taught.

Scholarship

Early scholarship 
Smith-Rosenberg has described her scholarly career trajectory as “built around forty years of university teaching, scholarly friends around the world, and… an increasingly progressive political vision” (Smith-Rosenberg, 2007).  She said that the political feminism of the 1960s led her to reshape the questions she asked and to push the boundaries of both the methods and the conceptual frameworks of traditional history (Smith-Rosenberg, 1985, p. 11).

Smith-Rosenberg's principal goal was “to so redefine the canons of traditional history that the events and processes central to women’s experience assume historic centrality, and women are recognized as active agents of social change” (DuBois et al., 1980, pp. 56–57). According to Smith-Rosenberg, her early scholarship focused on problems of urban poverty in Victorian America and the ways in which an emerging bourgeois elite attempted to understand and contain them (Smith-Rosenberg, 1985, p. 20).

Smith-Rosenberg's first book, Religion and the Rise of the American City, was published in 1971.  The book contained a study of the American Female Moral Reform Society, which she termed an “uniquely female institution” (Smith-Rosenberg, 1985, p. 11), During her research, Smith-Rosenberg, said that she discovered a passionate 40-year correspondence between two women. Suddenly, Smith-Rosenberg has recalled, “everywhere I looked, the private papers of ordinary women beckoned” (Smith-Rosenberg, 1985, p. 27).

Female World of Love and Ritual 
In 1975 Smith-Rosenberg published the article, “The Female World of Love and Ritual: Relations between Women in Nineteenth-Century America.” It was presented at the second Berkshire Conference on the History of Women (Melosh, 1990), and published as the lead article in the first-ever issue of Signs, the Journal of Women in Culture and Society (1975).

 Barbara Melosh called the article  it one of the most frequently cited in the scholarship on women's history and \ one of the first and most influential explorations of the history of lesbianism, notable for placing female sexuality within the larger context of gender construction (Melosh, 1990).  
 According to Linda Kerber, the separation of gender roles between women and men and resultant sexual patterns had been previously described only in terms of subordination and victimization. Smith-Rosenberg's article, however, “offered a striking reinterpretation of the possibilities of separation” (Kerber, 1997, p. 166). As Smith-Rosenberg later noted,
 As historian Claire Bond Potter pointed out to the Organization of American Historians (2015), “when feminist scholarship began to move definitively away from a movement context and women’s history became a multi-generational project, this article traveled in a way that few have” (see also Rupp, 2000).

Other publications 
Smith-Rosenberg went on to publish numerous articles addressing sexuality and gender relations in nineteenth century America, many of which were collected in her second book, Disorderly Conduct: Visions of Gender in Victorian America (1985).

Discussing the collection in the New York Times Book Review, Elizabeth Janeway (1985) wrote that “few historians have used the stream of myth and history so productively”; the book, she noted, “suggests a restructuring of the way we see history by presenting the reactions of men and women to the shock of industrial upheaval, and the interplay between their variant visions.”

New Family planning group 
In the 1980s Smith-Rosenberg was one of the principal organizers of the New Family and New Woman Research Planning Group. The Group brought together feminist scholars from  the US, the United Kingdom, France, Germany, the Netherlands and Italy.

The planning group “believed we had a historical mandate to identify new domains, create new institutions, or try to carve out places for ourselves in areas that had previously excluded, devalued, and ignored us” (Friedlander et al., 1986). The group's activities resulted in the volume, Women in Culture and Politics: A Century of Change (1986), edited by Judith Friedlander, Blanche Wiesen Cook, Alice Kessler-Harris, and Smith-Rosenberg.

This Violent Empire 
In 2010, Smith-Rosenberg published This Violent Empire: The Birth of an American National Identity.

 The book explores the question, “Why did a nation of immigrants, a people who see themselves as a model for democracies around the world, embrace a culture of violence?” Smith-Rosenberg traces this culture of violence “to the very processes by which the founding generation struggled to create a coherent national identity in the face of deep-seated ethnic, racial, religious, and regional divisions”(Common-Place, 2011).
 in the book, Smith-Rosenberg argues that America's founders consolidated a national sense of self by describing a series of "Others," including African Americans, Native Americans, women, and those without property, whose differences from the country's founders overshadowed the differences that divided the founders themselves The result, she argues, is an American national identity subject to xenophobia, racism and paranoia. (Smith-Rosenberg, 2011). 
 Reviewers have noted that, although its focus is on early U.S. history, the book speaks powerfully to U.S. political and cultural issues in a post 9/11 world (see, for example, Hansen, 2011; Jeffers, 2011).

Her latest book project both continues Smith-Rosenberg's interest in American “Others” and reaches back to her own Caribbean heritage. The project explores the concept of modern citizenship as emerging from intense interactions among four violent events in the Atlantic world: the U.S., French, Haitian and Irish Revolutions. It “focuses on the complex triangulation of race, slavery, and gender, using them to examine the contradictions and ambivalence lying at the heart of both citizenship and, most especially, of liberal political thought” (Aspen Institute, n.d.).

Teaching
Smith-Rosenberg began her teaching career at the University of Pennsylvania, in the 1960s when few women found positions in Ivy League institutions, teaching initially as an adjunct in the School of General Studies. In 1972 she became an assistant professor in both the Psychiatry and the History departments of the University. At Penn she founded and served as an early director of the University's Women's Studies Program (1982–1995).

From 1996 until her retirement in 2008 Smith-Rosenberg taught at the University of Michigan, Ann Arbor, where she is the Mary Frances Berry Collegiate Professor of History, American Culture, and Women's Studies (emerita). At Michigan, she served as graduate chair of the American Culture Program and director of the Atlantic Studies Initiative, which she helped to establish.  She has also been a visiting scholar at a number of academic institutions, including Columbia University, New York University, the City University of New York Graduate Center, and the Ecole des Hautes Etudes des Sciences Sociales, Paris.

Major publications

 Bodies. In Catharine R. Stimpson & Gilbert Herdt (Eds.), Critical Terms for the Study of Gender, 21 – 40. Chicago: The University of Chicago Press, 2014.
 This violent empire: The birth of an American national identity. Williamsburg, VA: Omahonda Institute of Early American History and Culture, University of North Carolina Press, 2010.
 Surrogate Americans: Masculinity, masquerade, and the formation of a national identity. PMLA: Publications of the Modern Language Association of America 119 No. 5 (October 2004).
 Black gothic: Race, gender and the construction of the American middle class. In Robert St. George (Ed.), Possible pasts: Becoming colonial in early America, 243 – 269. Ithaca: Cornell University Press, 2000.
 Political camp or the ambiguous engendering of the American Republic. In Catherine Hall, Ida Bloom & Karen Hagermann (Eds.), Gendered nations: Nationalisms and gender order in the long nineteenth century, 271–292.  New York: Bloomsbury Academic Press, 2000.
 Captive colonizers: Ambivalence and an emerging “American identity.” In Catherine Hall (Ed.), Gender and History: Special issue on gender, nationalism and national identity, 177 – 195. Gender and History 5 (Summer 1993).
 Dis-Covering the subject of the “Great Constitutional Discussion.” Journal of American History 79 No. 3 (December 1992), 841 – 873.
 Discourses of sexuality and subjectivity: The New Woman, 1870 – 1936. In Martin Duberman, Martha Vicinus, & George Chauncey, Jr. (Eds.), Hidden from history: Reclaiming the gay & lesbian past, 264 – 280. New York: New American Library, 1989.
 The body politic. In Elizabeth Weed (Ed.), Coming to terms: Feminism, theory, politics, 101–121. New York and London: Routledge, 1989.
 Domesticating virtue: Rebels and coquettes in young America. In Elaine Scarry (Ed.), Literature and the body, 160 – 184. Baltimore: Johns Hopkins University Press, 1988.
 Judith Friedlander, Blanche Wiesen Cook, Alice Kessler-Harris, & Carroll Smith-Rosenberg (Eds.) Women in culture and politics: A century of change. Bloomington, IN: Indiana University Press, 1986.
 Disorderly conduct: Visions of gender in Victorian America. New York: Oxford University Press, 1985.
 Ellen DuBois, MariJo Buhle, Temma Kaplan, Gerda Lerner & Carroll-Smith Rosenberg, Politics and culture in women's history: A symposium. Feminist Studies 6, no. 1 (Spring 1980), 56–57.
 The female world of love and ritual. Signs: Journal of Women in Culture and Society 1, no. 1, 1975, 1 – 30.
 Religion and the rise of the American city: The New York City mission movement 1812 – 1870. Ithaca, NY: Cornell University Press, 1971.
 Beauty, the beast, and the militant woman. American Quarterly 23 (1971),

Academic appointments

 University of Michigan, Mary Frances Berry Collegiate Professor of History, American Culture and Women's Studies (Emerita)
 University of Cagliari, Italy, Visiting Professor, 2011; 2015.
 Columbia University, Institute of African Studies, Visiting Professor, 2013
 New York University, Visiting Professor, Fall 2010
 Graduate Center, City University of New York, Visiting Professor, 2006 – 2010
 Director, Atlantic Studies Initiative, University of Michigan, 1999, 2006, 2007– 2008
 Graduate Chair, American Culture Program, University of Michigan, 1997 – 2002, 2006
 Ecole des Hautes Etudes en Sciences Sociales, Paris, Visiting Professor, Winter 2004
 University of Pennsylvania, Department of History and Psychiatry Department, 1971–1995
 Trustees’ Council of Penn Women, Professor in the Humanities, University of Pennsylvania, 1985–1995
 Director, Women's Studies Program, University of Pennsylvania, 1982–1995
 University of Canterbury, New Zealand, Visiting Professor, 1989
 Free University of Berlin, Visiting Professor, 1979 – 1980

Research fellowships

Michigan Humanities Fellowship, University of Michigan, 2000
Distinguished Visiting Scholar, Center for the Study of Ideas and Society, University of California, Riverside, 1998
Fellow, Rockefeller Conference Center, Bellagio, Italy, 1993
Guggenheim Foundation Fellow, 1990–1991
American Council of Learned Societies, Research Fellowship, 1989
Fellow, Institute of Advanced Studies, Princeton, 1987–1988
Rockefeller Foundation, Research Fellowship, 1981
American Council of Learned Societies, Research Fellowship, 1981
American Antiquarian Society, Research Fellow, 1976–1977
National Endowment for the Humanities (international conference director), 1975–1977
Radcliff Institute, Harvard University, Research Fellow, 1975–1976
Ford Foundation, Research Fellow, 1975–1976
National Institute of Child Health and Human Development, Psychiatry Fellow, 1972–1975
The Grant Foundation, Research Fellowship, 1970–1972
National Institute of Mental Health, Research Grant, 1969–1970
Social Science Research Council, Pre-doctoral Research Training Fellowship, 1961–1962

Awards and prizes

 Top 25 Academic Books Award for This Violent Empire, 2011
 John D’Arms Faculty Award for Distinguished Graduate Mentoring in the Humanities, University of Michigan, 2003
 The R. Jean Brownlee Award, for Distinguished Service, University of Pennsylvania, 2003
 Organization of American Historians Binkley-Stephenson Award for "Dis-Covering the Subject of the ‘Great Constitutional Discussion.’" Journal of American History, 1993
 Berkshire Conference of Women Historians, Prize for the best article for "Domesticating Virtue," 1988
 Organization of American Historians Binkley-Stephenson Award for "The Female Animal,” 1973
 Prize for best article, "Beauty, the Beast and the Militant Woman," American Quarterly, 1971
 Phi Beta Kappa, Connecticut College for Women, 1957

References

 Claire Bond Potter, “The female academic’s world of love and ritual: Women’s history and radical feminism.” Paper presented to the Organization of American Historians, St Louis, MO, April 17, 2015.
 Carroll Smith-Rosenberg, remarks at the 50th reunion, Connecticut College, June 2, 2007
 Carroll Smith-Rosenberg, Religion and the rise of the American city: The New York City mission movement 1812 – 1870 (Cornell University Press, 1971).
 Carroll Smith-Rosenberg, Disorderly conduct: Visions of gender in Victorian America (Oxford University Press, 1985).
 Ellen DuBois, MariJo Buhle, Temma Kaplan, Gerda Lerner & Carroll-Smith Rosenberg, “Politics and culture in women’s history: A symposium,” Feminist Studies 6, no. 1 (Spring 1980).
 Barbara Melosh, Recovery and revision: Women's history and West Virginia, Volume 49 of West Virginia History, 1990. Volume 1, No. 1, Autumn 1975.
 Linda K. Kerber, “Separate spheres, female worlds, women’s place: The rhetoric of women’s history,” in Kerber, Toward an intellectual history of women: Essays (University of North Carolina Press, 1997), p. 166.
 Lila Rupp, “Women’s history in the New Millenium: Carroll Smith-Rosenberg’s ‘The female world of love and ritual’ after twenty-five years,” Journal of Women’s History vol. 12 no. 3 (Autumn 2000), 8.
 Elizabeth Janeway, “New women, new problems,” review of Disorderly conduct in the New York Times Book Review, August 25, 1985.
 Foreword to Women in culture and politics: A century of change, edited by Judith Friedlander, Blanche Wiesen Cook, Alice Kessler-Harris, and Carroll Smith-Rosenberg (Indiana University Press, 1986).
 Carroll Smith-Rosenberg, This violent empire: The birth of an American national identity (Omahonda Institute of Early American History and Culture, University of North Carolina Press, 2010).
 “Ask the author,” Common-Place, vol. 12 no. 1, October 2011.
 Reviews of This Violent Empire by Jonathan Hansen, American Historical Review, April 2011; Joshua Jeffers in Essays in History, 2011.
 The Aspen Institute, ADS Works: Carroll-Smith Rosenberg (http://www.aspeninstitute.org/policy-works/fellows/carroll-smith-rosenberg)
 University of Pennsylvania (http://www.sas.upenn.edu/gsws/content/carroll-smith-rosenberg)
 University of Michigan, Ann Arbor (http://www.las.umich.edu/history/people/ci.smithrosenbergcarroll)
 Philip Deloria, comments at “Taking the Atlantic World Turn: A Symposium in Honor of Carroll Smith-Rosenberg,” December 4, 2002.

American feminists
American women academics
1936 births
Living people
21st-century American women